Killskär is a populated place in Tierp Municipality, in Uppsala County of Sweden.

References

Populated places in Uppsala County